Tak City Football Club is a Thai semi professional football new club based in Tak Province. They currently play in Thai League 4 Northern Region. This team Club-licensing football club didn't pass to play 2018 Thai League 4 Northern Region. This team is banned 2 years and Relegated to 2020 Thailand Amateur League Northern Region.

Timeline

History of events of Tak Football Club

Stadium and locations

Season by season record

P = Played
W = Games won
D = Games drawn
L = Games lost
F = Goals for
A = Goals against
Pts = Points
Pos = Final position

QR1 = First Qualifying Round
QR2 = Second Qualifying Round
R1 = Round 1
R2 = Round 2
R3 = Round 3
R4 = Round 4

R5 = Round 5
R6 = Round 6
QF = Quarter-finals
SF = Semi-finals
RU = Runners-up
W = Winners

Players

Current squad

References

External links 
 http://tl.smmonline.net/news/141555.html
 https://www.facebook.com/takcity63000

Association football clubs established in 2015
Football clubs in Thailand
Sport in Tak province
2015 establishments in Thailand